Salo Mountain is in the Beartooth Mountains in the U.S. state of Montana. The peak is one of the tallest in the Beartooth Mountains and is in the Absaroka-Beartooth Wilderness in Custer National Forest. The peak is unofficially named and lies immediately northwest of Castle Rock Glacier.

References

Salo
Beartooth Mountains
Mountains of Carbon County, Montana